The 2008 Dutch National Track Championships were Dutch national Championship for track cycling. The competitions took place at Omnisport Apeldoorn in Apeldoorn, the Netherlands from December 27 to December 30. Competitions were held of various track cycling disciplines in different age, gender and disability categories.

Medal summary

Elite

See also
2008 in track cycling

References

External links
Official event website

 
Dutch National track cycling championships
2008 in track cycling
Track cycling
Cycling in Apeldoorn